Four poster, Four-Poster, Four-poster, etc. may refer to:

Four-poster bed
The Fourposter, a  1951 play by Jan de Hartog
The Four Poster (film), a 1952 American comedy-drama film based on the 1951 play
The Four Poster (1964 film), a 1964 Australian TV play based on the 1951 play 
4-poster or four poster, an automotive test system
The Four-poster, the English title for Le Lit à colonnes, a 1942  French drama film